Erode Fort was a fort in Erode, India. Francis Buchanan described it in 1800 as being

References

Erode
Forts in Tamil Nadu
Former forts
Neighbourhoods in Erode